The Wave Gathering Music Festival was co-founded by Adam Weisberg, Scott Stamper, Gordon Brown, and Larry Katz. It is held in Asbury Park, New Jersey, USA. It is an annual American music festival modeled after South by Southwest and Austin City Limits Music Festival that is held across the entire town, spanning several days. During this time, cafes, restaurants, parks, shops, the boardwalk, nightclubs, and local vendors offer local and regional music, art, and food to the crowds. The Wave Gathering includes approximately 16 stages on which approximately 150-160 local, regional, and national music acts play alternative, blues, folk, indie, electronic, rock, and other genres of music. Other performing arts are represented as well. At this point, the Wave Gathering has an ambiance and size similar to that of those established festivals in their early years.

See also
Asbury Park Music Awards
The Saint (music venue)

References

Asbury Park, New Jersey
Music festivals in New Jersey
Rock festivals in the United States